Sára Szenteleki-Ligetkuti (born 20 April 1945) is a Hungarian middle-distance runner. She competed in the women's 1500 metres at the 1972 Summer Olympics.

References

1945 births
Living people
Athletes (track and field) at the 1972 Summer Olympics
Hungarian female middle-distance runners
Olympic athletes of Hungary
Place of birth missing (living people)